Marbaix is a commune in the Nord department in northern France.

Etymology
Marbaix has historically been attested as Marbasio in 1151. The toponym Marbaix is of Germanic origin, deriving from a High German dialect, ultimately from Proto-West-Germanic *marh. The Germanic hydronym *-bak(i) entered the French language via High German, and took on two forms: the Germanic form -bach and Romantic -bais.

Heraldry

See also
Communes of the Nord department

References

Communes of Nord (French department)